Colonel Sir Arthur George Hammond  (28 September 1843 – 20 April 1919) was an English recipient of the Victoria Cross, the highest and most prestigious award for gallantry in the face of the enemy that can be awarded to British and Commonwealth forces.

Early life and career
Arthur Hammond was born in Dawlish, Devon on 23 September 1843, the fifth son of Major T.G. Hammond, Abbey Grange, Sherborne, Dorset.  Arthur attended Sherborne School as a day boy from 1852 to 1860.  After leaving Sherborne he attended Addiscombe Military Seminary and in 1861 entered the Indian Staff Corps. After serving in the 82nd Regiment of Foot (Prince of Wales's Volunteer Regiment) he joined the Bengal Staff Corps and Queen Victoria's Own Corps of Guides.  He served in the Jowaki Afridi Expedition with the Guides in 1877 (mentioned in Despatches), and the Afghan War 1878–80 at Ali Musjid, Tahkt-i-Shan and Asmai Heights and Kabul.

VC action
Hammond was 36 years old, and a captain in the Bengal Staff Corps, British Indian Army during the Second Anglo-Afghan War when the following deed took place on 14 December 1879 at the action on the Asmai Heights, near Kabul, Afghanistan, for which he was awarded the VC:

Subsequent career and death
In addition to the Afghan War, he served in the Jowaki Campaign of 1877-1878 and also in the Hazara Campaigns of 1888 and 1891 (CB and Mention), commanded BDe in the Isazai Expedition 1892, Chitral Relief Force 1895 (Mention and thanks of Indian Government), and the Tirah Campaign of 1897-1898 (Commanded Peshawar Column).

He became A.D.C. to Queen Victoria in 1890.

He was promoted to a Knight Commander of the Order of the Bath (KCB) in the 1903 Durbar Honours.

Following his long military career, Arthur Hammond retired to Camberley in Surrey where he named his residence Sherborne House. He died in April 1919 and is buried in St. Michael's Churchyard, Camberley. He was the father of Arthur Verney Hammond.

His obituary appeared in The Shirburnian, June 1919: 

His VC is in private hands.

References

Career overview
Biography
Location of grave and VC medal (Surrey)
Service details
Sherborne School Archives

People from Dawlish
1843 births
1919 deaths
British recipients of the Victoria Cross
British military personnel of the Tirah campaign
Knights Commander of the Order of the Bath
Companions of the Distinguished Service Order
Second Anglo-Afghan War recipients of the Victoria Cross
British military personnel of the Chitral Expedition
Corps of Guides (India) officers
Bengal Staff Corps officers
People educated at Sherborne School
South Lancashire Regiment officers
British military personnel of the Hazara Expedition of 1888
Graduates of Addiscombe Military Seminary